Blocco automatico a correnti codificate (BACC or BAcc, automatic block with codified currents) is a signalling block system used in Italy on railway lines using 3 kV DC electrification.

The track circuits used to detect the presence of a train also transmit coded signals to the trains which are used for train protection and cab signaling. Train protection systems that use BAcc are RS4 Codici, RS9 Codici and SCMT.

Codes 
The information is conveyed by superposition of two amplitude-modulated alternating currents in the rails (with a carrier frequency of 50 Hz and 178 Hz, respectively). Receiver coils in front of the first axle of a locomotive or control car are used to detect the signal.

The frequency of the modulating signal encodes the signal aspect:

While RS4 Codici is a simple cab signalling system that only requires the driver to acknowledge any change in the aspect of the next signal, SSB (On board sub system) RS9 equipment also continuously monitors the train speed and computes braking curves according to the train's length, mass, and braking ability.

RS4 Codici uses a single 50 Hz alternating current. All codes that do not use the 178 Hz carrier are used identically for both RS4 and RS9 Codici. Thus, RS9 is backward-compatible to RS4 Codici.

An alarm is sounded in the cab if the train exceeds the speed setpoint by more than 3 km/h. If the train exceeds the speed setpoint by more than 5 km/h or misses the designated stopping place, the system applies emergency brakes.

References
 https://web.archive.org/web/20060506191231/http://www.segnalifs.it/it/bl/N_barsc.htm

Railway signalling in Italy
Electric railways in Italy